Roger Whitworth Kirkpatrick (1923-2013) was a footballer who played as an inside forward in the Football League for Chester.

References

1923 births
2013 deaths
People from Sculcoates
Footballers from the East Riding of Yorkshire
Association football inside forwards
English footballers
Chester City F.C. players
Altrincham F.C. players
English Football League players